Else-Marie Lindmark-Ljungdahl (born 11 June 1942) is a Swedish sprint canoer. She competed at the 1960 and 1964 Olympics in the 500m kayak events, individual and doubles, and finished in 5–6 place. Her father, Edmund Lindmark, was an Olympic gymnast and diver.

References

1942 births
Canoeists at the 1960 Summer Olympics
Canoeists at the 1964 Summer Olympics
Living people
Olympic canoeists of Sweden
Swedish female canoeists